The first season of Hell's Kitchen Suomi aired in Finland on MTV3 in 2013. The season was hosted by Sauli Kemppainen. 14 contestants competed to win an opportunity to cook at Hotel Kämp under the direction of Sauli Kemppainen and a €25,000 cash prize.

Contestants
Sources:

Contestants progress

References

Finnish reality television series
2013 Finnish television seasons